Charlotte Franklin Hatherley (born 20 June 1979) is an English singer, songwriter, guitarist and soundtrack composer. She initially came to prominence as guitarist and backing vocalist for alternative rock band Ash. Since leaving Ash in 2006, she has pursued a solo career and acted as a touring instrumentalist for Bryan Ferry, KT Tunstall, Bat for Lashes, Cold Specks, Rosie Lowe and Birdy. Hatherley has also been a touring member of NZCA Lines and is currently musical director for South African artist Nakhane.

Biography

Ash (1997–2006)

Born in London, Hatherley was brought up in West London and attended Chiswick Community School. Her music career began at the age of 15, when she joined British punk band Nightnurse. Two years later, with Ash looking for a guitarist to add to their live sound, Hatherley was hired after frontman Tim Wheeler saw her play at a Nightnurse gig. Hatherley's Ash debut was at Belfast's Limelight on 10 August 1997, and the following week the new lineup played the 1997 V Festival in front of 50,000 people. Her recording career with the band began later that year on the single "A Life Less Ordinary" and continued on the album Nu-Clear Sounds in 1998.

Hatherley was a full-time member of Ash for eight years, playing on three studio albums, and wrote a handful of the band's songs, most notably "Grey Will Fade", on the B-side of the single "There's a Star". The song was a cult favourite among fans, and eventually became the title track of Hatherley's debut solo album. On 20 January 2006 it was announced that Hatherley would be leaving Ash in an amicable breakup.

Solo (2004–present)
While recording the album Meltdown with Ash, Hatherley began to record her own album Grey Will Fade. From the album she released the singles "Bastardo", "Summer" (both videos directed by Edgar Wright), and "Kim Wilde", which all received high praise from critics.

Hatherley's second album The Deep Blue was released on 5 March 2007. It was preceded by two singles; "Behave", in December, and "I Want You To Know" along with an accompanying UK and Ireland tour. For Nokia Online, David Bowie reviewed “Behave”, writing, 'Behave is proof that Charlotte made the right decision to go solo. The guitar part is an instant hook, that has a kind of Eno-esque quirkiness about it... Impossibly catchy, you’ll find this popping into your head when you least expect it'. Two more singles were released to promote the album, "Siberia" and "Again". In 2007, Hatherley opened for Blondie on their UK tour.

Hatherley's third solo album New Worlds was released on October 2009. Pitchfork gave the album 8.0, writing, ‘Hatherley is a meticulous artist, and her songs are carefully constructed things designed for a powerful dynamic impact without sacrificing elegance and grace. She's the best sort of craft-driven writer, consistently avoiding ostentatious displays of technical ingenuity while subtly exerting her skill in ways that call attention to, rather than distract from, her melodies.’ The album was also The Sunday Times' record of the week: ‘These are sensational songs, from an artist who remains bafflingly overlooked, but continues to dive into that tiny pool and come up bearing pearls.’

In February 2012, Hatherley began performing under the name of Sylver Tongue. She released the Something Big EP in November 2012. Sylver Tongue supported Bat for Lashes on their October/November 2012 UK tour.

In 2017, Hatherley pre-released a solo album via PledgeMusic called True Love. Inspired by her love of science fiction, the album tells the story of Traveller, a heartbroken alien searching for love. It received a 4/5 star review in The Evening Standard. Their critic wrote, 'Vangelis’s Blade Runner soundtrack is the obvious inspiration behind these ethereal soundscapes, although this is much more than derivative, fangirl fare. A Sign and Hook You Up are glorious pop songs in their own right, while Hatherley’s yearning vocals ensure that even the most robotic moments retain a compelling human core.' The album was officially released in June 2018. Electronic Sound magazine wrote: 'This is an album easy to fall in love with, from the yearning 'A Sign' to the gorgeous 'You Said Goodbye' its electronic teardrops and emotional nakedness could soundtrack any broken love affair'.

Three singles were released from the record, "A Sign", "Night Vision" and "Hook You Up". The five-track Night Vision EP contained cover versions of songs from cinema, including the Bee Gees’ "How Deep Is Your Love", the video for which was made in collaboration with the European Space Agency.

Film and theatre scoring (2013–present)
Hatherley wrote the score for director Gavin Rothery's sci-fi short film The Last Man. The film premiered at the FrightFest festival in London in 2014. Hatherley performed the score at the British Film Institute as part of their major three-month focus on sci-fi on screen, ‘Days of Fear and Wonder’. In 2014 Hatherley also composed the music for Stella Feehily’s play This May Hurt A Bit, directed by Max Stafford-Clark.

In 2019, Hatherley composed the score for the film Imogen which was due to premiere at Oscar qualifying film festival AMDOCS in Palm Springs, on 27 March 2020, as part of the Official Selection (postponed due to Covid-19). Produced by Margo Mars and Alma Har'el, the film is directed by Lola Young and Matt Shea and supported by the BFI Doc Society and LUSH film fund. The soundtrack was released in May 2020.

In 2021 she played guitars on composer Frank Ilfman's score for the film Gunpowder Milkshake.

Collaborative work
In 2007, Hatherley was a touring guitarist for Bryan Ferry, and in 2009 joined Bat for Lashes as a live member of the band.

In 2010, Hatherley joined KT Tunstall's band, playing lead guitar. The 2010/11 tour coincided with the release of Tunstall's Tiger Suit album. In an interview with the Galway Advertiser, Tunstall said that Hatherley had helped her 'to find the voice that she had always been searching for.' "Charlotte has just blown us all away. She’s an exceptionally talented musician and very visceral. It’s just pure emotion when she plays." Hatherley has subsequently recorded guitar on Tunstall's albums Kin and Wax and played guitar on her 2018 tour.

During 2015/2016, Hatherley was a performing member of Cold Specks and NZCA Lines, and throughout 2016/2017 toured as guitarist/keyboardist for Birdy coinciding with the release of Birdy’s Beautiful Lies album. In 2019 Hatherley played for Frank Turner,  and played on Fred Deakin's album The Lasters.

In 2021 Hatherley played on Imelda May's album 11 Past the Hour and Natalie Imbruglia's Firebird.

Since October 2017, Hatherley has been musical director, guitarist, and keyboardist for South African artist Nakhane.

Personal life
Hatherley's mother, Patricia Franklin, is an actress.  Her father, Frank Hatherley, is an Australian playwright and critic.

She had a daughter, Rosa, on 30 June 2020.

Discography

Albums

Singles

Music videos

References

External links
 

1979 births
Living people
English women songwriters
English women guitarists
Musicians from London
Women rock singers
Ash (band) members
English rock bass guitarists
English rock guitarists
English rock pianists
English people of Australian descent
Women bass guitarists
21st-century British women singers
21st-century English bass guitarists
21st-century women pianists